Meteor Tallinn is a former football club from the Estonian capital Tallinn.

History
The club was founded in 1908 in the district Lasnamäe Tallinn, making it the oldest football club in Estonia. The jersey was blue and white, and trousers where white. A short time later was based in Tallinn, another football club, whose name was Merkuur. Meteor played against Merkuur on 6 June 1909 the first football game in Estonia and won 4–2.

See also
Estonian Football Association

References

Defunct football clubs in Estonia
Association football clubs established in 1908
Meteor Tallinn
1908 establishments in Estonia